The 2016–17 Korisliiga season is the 77th season of the top professional basketball league in Finland. The season started on October 5, 2016, and ended on May 13, 2017. Kataja Basket won its second national title after beating Salon Vilpas in the Finals.

Teams

Bisons Loimaa left the league after the 2015–16 season, because of its financial problems. Korihait was promoted from the second tier First Division after winning the championship there.

Regular season

Standings

Playoffs
Playoffs were played between the eight teams of the competition, with a best-of-five series in quarterfinals a best-of-seven series in semifinals and finals and the bronze medal series as a single game.

Attendance
Included playoffs games.

References

Korisliiga seasons
Finnish
Koris